Dekemhare Subregion is a subregion in the southern Debub region (Zoba Debub) of Eritrea. Its capital lies at Dekemhare.

References

Subregions of Eritrea

Southern Region (Eritrea)
Dekemhare
Subregions of Eritrea